The Independent National Party, also known locally as Independent Nationalism,  was a political party in Uruguay.

Established in 1931 as a split from the National Party.

Among its most prominent members were: Martín C. Martínez, Washington Beltrán Mullin, and Juan A. Ramírez.

Sources
Uruguayan electoral system

Defunct political parties in Uruguay
1931 establishments in Uruguay
Political parties established in 1931
Political parties disestablished in 1958
Uruguayan nationalism